Reinaldo de Souza or simply Reinaldo (born June 8, 1980 in Rio de Janeiro), is a Brazilian striker.

Honours
Rio de Janeiro State League: 2006

Contract
Botafogo (Loan) 1 August 2007 to 31 July 2008

External links

CBF
mercadofutebol

1980 births
Living people
Brazilian footballers
Brazilian expatriate footballers
Sociedade Esportiva Palmeiras players
Avaí FC players
Criciúma Esporte Clube players
Botafogo de Futebol e Regatas players
Grêmio Foot-Ball Porto Alegrense players
Guarani FC players
Oeste Futebol Clube players
Guaratinguetá Futebol players
Chiapas F.C. footballers
Liga MX players
Ulsan Hyundai FC players
K League 1 players
Manisaspor footballers
Expatriate footballers in Mexico
Expatriate footballers in Turkey
Brazilian expatriate sportspeople in Turkey
Expatriate footballers in South Korea
Brazilian expatriate sportspeople in South Korea
Association football forwards
Footballers from Rio de Janeiro (city)